Japan Air Lines Flight 471 was a Japan Air Lines international flight from Don Mueang International Airport in Bangkok, Thailand to Palam International Airport (now Indira Gandhi International Airport) in New Delhi, India. On 14 June 1972 the Douglas DC-8-53 operating the flight, registered JA8012, crashed short of the New Delhi airport, killing 82 of 87 occupants: 10 of 11 crew members, and 72 of 76 passengers. Four people on the ground were also killed.

Passengers 
Sixteen of the dead were Americans. Brazilian actress Leila Diniz was also among those killed, as was the sole Indian passenger on the flight, Dr. K.K.P. Narasinga Rao, a senior official of the Food and Agricultural Organization (FAO) of the United Nations.

One of the cabin attendants that were killed in the crash was the sister of San'yūtei Enraku V.

Sequence of events 
The flight was on the Bangkok-New Delhi portion of its Tokyo-London route when the accident occurred.  The flight took off from Don Mueang International Airport in Bangkok at 11:21 UTC en route to New Delhi.  At 14:43 UTC, the flight was given clearance for a straight-in ILS approach to runway 28. The plane crashed into the banks of the Yamuna River not long after the 23 mile (43 km) report from the DME.

Cause 
The exact cause of the accident remains disputed.  Investigators representing Japan pointed to the possibility of a false glide path signal causing the crash.  Indian investigators claimed the crash was caused by pilot error, specifically the captain ignoring instrument indications and not having sight of the runway (the first officer was flying the approach to New Delhi).

See also

Indian Airlines Flight 440, another aviation disaster that took place at Palam less than a year after Japan Airlines Flight 471.

References

Airliner accidents and incidents caused by pilot error
471
Aviation accidents and incidents in India
Aviation accidents and incidents in 1972
Accidents and incidents involving the Douglas DC-8
Aviation accident investigations with disputed causes
1972 in India
1972 in Japan
June 1972 events in Asia